Vahid Fazeli (Persian: وحید فاضلی) is an Iranian football manager who was head coach of Nassaji Mazandaran. Fazeli has a Ph.D. in exercise physiology. He has successful records in coaching and numerous promotions, including promotion of Naft Masjed Soleyman to the Premier League. He joined Nassaji Mazandaran as an assistant to Mahmoud Fekri in 2019–2020, and subsequently became manager. Afterwards, he joined Padideh, and later became Zvonimir Soldo's assistant at Tractor. Subsequently, he joined Aluminium Arak as an assistant.

References

1982 births
Living people
Iranian football managers
F.C. Nassaji Mazandaran managers